Vladimir Mikhailovich Shtapov (16 April 1946 – 20 March 2020) was a Russian professional football player and coach.

Club career
As a player, he made his professional debut in the Soviet Top League in 1965 for FC Dynamo Moscow.

Honours
 Soviet Top League runner-up: 1967, 1970.
 Soviet Cup winner: 1967, 1970.
 European Cup Winners' Cup 1971–72 finalist (2 games).

References

1946 births
Footballers from Moscow
2020 deaths
Soviet footballers
Association football defenders
Association football midfielders
FC Dynamo Moscow players
FC Torpedo Moscow players
Soviet Top League players
FC Dynamo Bryansk players
FC Dynamo Vologda players
Russian football managers
FC Khimki managers